Drina is a Bosnian brand of cigarettes, currently owned and manufactured by the Sarajevo Tobacco Factory. The brand is named after the Drina river, which forms a part of the international border between Serbia and Bosnia and Herzegovina.

History
The brand was founded after the end of World War II in the Socialist Republic of Bosnia and Herzegovina. The brand quickly became one of the most popular cigarette brands in Yugoslavia, similar to brands like Morava and Drava. The brand is one of the few ex-Yugoslavian cigarette brands that survived the breakup of Yugoslavia and is still being sold today being the most popular brand in Bosnia and Herzegovina. The feature that makes this brand unique is that it uses special Ravnjak type tobacco, instead of traditional Virginia or Burley type tobacco brands.

Markets
Drina was or still is being sold in the following countries: Switzerland, Austro-Hungarian rule in Bosnia and Herzegovina, Kingdom of Yugoslavia, Yugoslavia, Socialist Republic of Croatia, Socialist Republic of Serbia, Serbia and Montenegro, Serbia, Socialist Republic of Bosnia and Herzegovina, and Bosnia and Herzegovina.

Variants

 Drina Denifine
 Drina Jedina
 Drina Gold
 Drina Silver

Below are all the current brands of Drina cigarettes sold, with the levels of tar, nicotine and carbon monoxide included.

See also

 Tobacco smoking
 Elita (cigarette)
 Filter 57 (cigarette)
 Jadran (cigarette)
 Laika (cigarette)
 Lovćen (cigarette)
 Morava (cigarette)
 Partner (cigarette)
 Smart (cigarette)
 Time (cigarette)
 Sobranie
 Jin Ling
 LD (cigarette)
 Walter Wolf (cigarette)

References

Cigarette brands